Mount Dubois is in the White Mountains in the U.S. state of California. Mount Dubois is in the White Mountains Wilderness of Inyo National Forest.

References

Mountains of Mono County, California
Inyo National Forest